It was a small Dacian fortress surrounded by moat and wall enclosing three terraces. It was dated between 1st century BC and 1st century AD.

References

Dacian fortresses in Harghita County
Ancient history of Transylvania